In combinatorial mathematics, the q-difference polynomials or q-harmonic polynomials are a polynomial sequence defined in terms of the q-derivative. They are a generalized type of Brenke polynomial, and generalize the Appell polynomials.  See also Sheffer sequence.

Definition
The q-difference polynomials satisfy the relation

where the derivative symbol on the left is the q-derivative.

Generating function
The generalized generating function for these polynomials is of the type of generating function for Brenke polynomials, namely

where  is the q-exponential:

Here,  is the q-factorial and

is the q-Pochhammer symbol. The function  is arbitrary but assumed to have an expansion

Any such  gives a sequence of q-difference polynomials.

References
 A. Sharma and A. M. Chak, "The basic analogue of a class of polynomials", Riv. Mat. Univ. Parma, 5 (1954) 325–337.
 Ralph P. Boas, Jr. and R. Creighton Buck, Polynomial Expansions of Analytic Functions (Second Printing Corrected), (1964) Academic Press Inc., Publishers New York, Springer-Verlag, Berlin. Library of Congress Card Number 63-23263. (Provides a very brief discussion of convergence.)

Q-analogs
Polynomials